Salon des Refusés is George Pringle's debut album, released on 7 September 2009 by her own record label Deth to Fals Metal Records. Demos for most of the songs on the album had appeared on George's Myspace prior to the album's release.

Track listing
 "Big Screen Kiss Scene"
 "We could have been heroes..."
 "Carte Postale"
 "Sparkomatic Miami"
 "Physical Education (part 1)" 
 "LCD I love you but you're bringing me down..."
 "Fellini for Prime Minister"
 "Bonjour Tristesse"
 "Pop Hit"
 "One night in KOKO"
 "Extremely verbal after midnight"
 "S.W.10"

Singles
 Pop Hit was released on limited edition Vinyl and as an MP3 single on iTunes and AmazonMP3.
 Physical Education was released on iTunes and AmazonMP3 along with an Instrumental version of the song.

References 

2009 albums
George Pringle albums